Friends  is a show by the Heart Signal production team and features cast members from Heart Signal 2 and Heart Signal 3. It follows the daily lives of its cast while highlighting their budding friendships and romance.

Broadcast schedule

MC 

 Lee Sang-min - Main MC
 Kim Hee-chul (Super Junior)
 Shindong (Super Junior)
 Seunghee (Oh My Girl)

Cast

List of episodes 

See also 
 Heart Signal

References 

Channel A (TV channel) original programming
South Korean variety television shows
South Korean dating and relationship reality television series
2021 South Korean television series debuts
2021 South Korean television series endings